A dome is a structural element of architecture that resembles the hollow upper half of a sphere.

Dome may also refer to:

Architecture
 Geodesic dome
 Monolithic dome

Geology
 Dome (geology), a deformational feature consisting of symmetrically-dipping anticlines
 Granite dome, a dome of granite, formed by exfoliation
 Lava dome, a mound-shaped growth resulting from the eruption of high-silica lava from a volcano
 Lunar dome,  a type of shield volcano found on the surface of the Earth's moon
 Resurgent dome, a volcanic dome that is swelling or rising due to movement in the magma chamber
 Salt dome, formed when a thick bed of evaporite minerals (mainly salt, or halite) found at depth intrudes vertically into surrounding rock strata

Places

Arenas
 Hubert H. Humphrey Metrodome (1982), Minneapolis, Minnesota, also known as "The Dome" or "The Metrodome"
 Millennium Dome (1999), London also known as "The Dome"
 NRG Astrodome (1999), Houston, Texas, also known as the "Astrodome" or the "Houston Astrodome"
 Le Dôme de Marseille, France

Places

Antarctica
 Arctowski Dome
 Anderson Dome
 Bonnabeau Dome
 Dome A
 Dome C
 Dome F
 Law Dome
 Siege Dome
 Titan Dome

Asia

Domé, one of the Tibetan names for the Amdo region

Canada
 Dome Mine, Ontario

United States
Teapot  Dome (also known as Teapot Rock), Wyoming

People
 Malcolm Dome (1955-2021), English music journalist
 Ram Chandra Dome (born 1959), Indian politician
 Dome (artist) (born 1975), German graffiti artist

Art, entertainment, and media
 Dome (band), a 1980s post punk band
 Dome (album)
 Dome (1987), a science fiction novel by Michael Reaves and Steve Perry
 The Dome (periodical), a quarterly publication of the Victorian era, containing examples of contemporary literature, art and music
 Under the Dome (TV series), an American television series

Enterprises
 Dôme (coffeehouse), a chain of café restaurants based in Perth, Australia
 Dome (constructor),  a Japanese-based racing car constructor
 Le Dôme, a garagiste wine label of Bordeaux wine producer Château Teyssier
 Le Dôme Café, historical Paris intellectual venue

Math, science, and technology
 Dome (mathematics), a closed geometrical surface which can be obtained by sectioning off a portion of a sphere with an intersecting plane
 DOME project, a computer architecture project for the Square Kilometre Array, designed by ASTRON and IBM Zurich Research Laboratory
 Norton's dome, a thought experiment concerning causality in Newtonian mechanics
 Dome, colloquial term for an overshooting top above a thunderstorm anvil cloud

Transportation
 Dome car, a type of railway passenger car
 Dome/GWCC/Philips Arena/CNN Center (MARTA station), a passenger rail station in Atlanta, Georgia named after the Georgia Dome
 Steam dome, a steam locomotive component

Other uses
Teapot Dome scandal, Wyoming, United States
Dome, slang for the upper half of the head or a bald head or a head
Dome, slang for fellatio
Iron Dome is a mobile air defense system
Retroflex consonant, or "domal consonant"